Line 3 of the Dongguan Rail Transit  is a planned subway line in Dongguan, China. It has a planned 24 stations from Qishibosha in the North-east of Dongguan, to Chang'an New Area South, in the south of Dongguan. The construction date for Line 3 has not yet been published.

Stations
From north to south:

 Qishibosha
 East Industrial Zone
 Dongshan Dadao
 Qiaotouxi (Qiaotou East)
 Dadong Lu
 Dongguan West railway station
 Dongguan South railway station
 Changping Bei
 Beihuan Lu
 Dongkengnan
 Zhongxing Dadao
 Songghan Lake North
 Songshan Lake - Interchange with Line 1
 Songshan Lake Higher Education Mega Center
 Songshanhu National High-tech Industrial Development Zone
 Haiyue Garden
 Lianhua Square
 Chang'an Pedestrian Street
 Chang'an Wushacun
 Chang'an Jinsha
 Chang'an Jian'an Lu
 Chang'an New Area North
 Chang'an New Area - Interchange with Line 2
 Chang'an New Area South

List of planned lines
Line 1
Line 2
Line 3
Line 4

See also
 Guangzhou Metro
 FMetro
 Shenzhen Metro
 List of rapid transit systems
 Metro systems by annual passenger rides

References

External links
 Dongguan Rail Transit – official website 

Dongguan Rail Transit lines
Transport infrastructure under construction in China